The Provincial Court of Manitoba is the lower trial court of the Province of Manitoba. It has mainly a criminal jurisdiction, as well as limited concurrent jurisdiction with the Court of King's Bench in matters of family law that originate outside of Winnipeg.

It also hears all Youth Court cases in the province; all provincial statute cases, such as those under The Highway Traffic Act and The Liquor Control Act; presides over inquests under The Fatality Inquiries Act; and reviews alleged police misconduct under The Law Enforcement Review Act.

Over 95% of all criminal cases in Manitoba take place in the Provincial Court.

Judges

Current judges
Judges of the Provincial Court are appointed by Order-in-Council of the Province of Manitoba upon the recommendation of a judicial nominating committee, which is composed of the Chief Judge, three citizens appointed by the provincial government, the President of the Law Society of Manitoba, the President of the Manitoba Bar Association, and a representative of the Provincial Court judges.

Former judges

Judicial Justices of the Peace 
Judicial Justices of the Peace conduct trials; conduct sentencing hearings under The Provincial Offences Act, including matters relating to the Highway Traffic Act; conduct hearings regarding protection orders under The Domestic Violence and Stalking Act; consider the issuance of search warrants and production orders; and consider applications for judicial interim release.

Judicial Justices of the Peace are appointed by the Lieutenant Governor in Council upon the recommendation of a nominating committee.

See also

 Provincial and territorial courts in Canada

References

External links
 Provincial Court of Manitoba website
 Provincial Court Annual Reports 2002 to 2016

Manitoba courts
Manitoba